Lactococcus is a genus of lactic acid bacteria that were formerly included in the genus Streptococcus Group N1. They are known as homofermenters meaning that they produce a single product, lactic acid in this case, as the major or only product of glucose fermentation. Their homofermentative character can be altered by adjusting environmental conditions such as pH, glucose concentration, and nutrient limitation. They are gram-positive, catalase-negative, non-motile cocci that are found singly, in pairs, or in chains. The genus contains strains known to grow at or below 7˚C.

Twelve species of Lactococcus are currently recognized. They are:
Lactococcus chungangensis
Lactococcus formosensis
Lactococcus fujiensis
Lactococcus garvieae
L. garvieae subsp. garvieaeL. garvieae subsp. bovis
Lactococcus hircilactis
Lactococcus lactis
L. lactis subsp. cremoris
L. lactis subsp. hordniae
L. lactis subsp. lactis
L. lactis subsp. tructae
Lactococcus laudensis
Lactococcus nasutitermitis
Lactococcus piscium
Lactococcus plantarum
Lactococcus raffinolactis
Lactococcus taiwanensis

These organisms are commonly used in the dairy industry in the manufacture of fermented dairy products such as cheeses. They can be used in single-strain starter cultures, or in mixed-strain cultures with other lactic acid bacteria such as Lactobacillus and Streptococcus. Special interest is placed on the study of L. lactis subsp. lactis and L. lactis subsp. cremoris, as they are the strains used as starter cultures in industrial dairy fermentations. Their main purpose in dairy production is the rapid acidification of milk; this causes a drop in the pH of the fermented product, which prevents the growth of spoilage bacteria. The bacteria also play a role in the flavor of the final product.
Lactococci are currently being used in the biotechnology industry. They are easily grown at industrial scale on whey-based media. As food-grade bacteria, they are used in the production of foreign proteins that are applied to the food industry.

Diseases
Lactococcosis refers to a group of disorders caused by the bacterium L. garvieae. Most "Lacto" species dwell on the bodies of humans and animals, and while they do not cause serious problems in higher animals, they do cause chronic illnesses in lower animals, particularly fish.

References

Streptococcaceae
Cheese
Bacteria genera